The following is list of episodes for the Japanese anime Scrapped Princess. The opening theme is Little Wing by JAM Project featuring Masami Okui while the ending theme is Daichi no la-li-la by Yoko Ueno and Masumi Itō.

Episode list

Scrapped Princess